Peter J. Quinn, an information technology (IT) worker, was chief information officer (CIO) of the Commonwealth of Massachusetts from September 2002 through January 2006. He is noted for his controversial support for OpenDocument, a standard format for office documents (ISO/IEC 26300).

Quinn established a requirement that all state government documents be formatted in OpenDocument (effective 2007). This created intense opposition from Microsoft, whose Office software uses proprietary formats and does not recognize OpenDocument files. Quinn was supported by his boss Eric Kriss and others. But he was also opposed in his efforts; for example by Massachusetts Secretary of the Commonwealth William F. Galvin. Furthermore, Stephen Kurkjian of the Boston Globe suggested that Quinn had a conflict of interest. He was a speaker at IT conferences that paid part of his trip expenses. Quinn was cleared of wrongdoing, but he has resigned, stating the following:

Over the last several months, we have been through some very difficult and tumultuous times. Many of these events have been very disruptive and harmful to my personal well being, my family and many of my closest friends. This is a burden I will no longer carry....I have become a lightning rod with regard to any IT initiative. Even the smallest initiatives are being mitigated or stopped by some of the most unlikely and often uninformed parties. The last thing I can let happen is my presence be the major contributing factor in marginalizing the good work of ITD and the entire IT community.

In an interview Quinn stated that "he hears Microsoft was the Boston Globe's source."

After leaving the CIO role in Massachusetts, Quinn landed a position in 2015 with the State of Ohio, where he was ousted for financial wrongdoing.  His ouster came after Ohio’s inspector general in December accused him of conspiring to rig $469,000 worth of price-inflated IT contracts with that state's Workers Compensation bureau. Following his Ohio position, Quinn landed a job with New York City's Department of Education in 2016. Quinn quit his job as NYC opened an investigation into his behavior.  

Quinn is a graduate of Cambridge College.

References

Further reading
Weisman, Robert (14 February 2005). “Government agencies adopt open source: State, cities see savings in sharing software”. Boston Globe.

Year of birth missing (living people)
Living people
Chief information officers
Cambridge College alumni